Energy is the 10th studio album by jazz group Fourplay, released on September 23, 2008. The cover shows the four members: keyboardist Bob James, guitarist Larry Carlton, bassist Nathan East, and drummer Harvey Mason.

Energy grafts a variety of sounds—R&B, pop, African—to Fourplay's jazz foundation. In addition to vocals by East, a member since the band's inception in 1990, the album includes vocals by Esperanza Spalding. The single "Fortune Teller" was nominated for a Grammy Award in the category Best Pop Instrumental Performance at the 51st Grammy Awards 2009. This was guitarist Larry Carlton's last Fourplay album before Chuck Loeb joined in 2010.

Track listing 
 "Fortune Teller" (Jeff Babko, Nathan East, Bob James) - 5:53
 "The Whistler" (Harvey Mason) - 5:28
 "Ultralight" (Larry Carlton) - 4:17
 "Cape Town" (Alan Dones, Marcel East, N. East) - 4:57
 "The Yes Club" (James) - 5:07
 "Prelude for Lovers"; feat. Esperanza Spalding (Kevin DiSimone) - 3:12
 "Look Both Ways" (James) - 6:36
 "Argentina" (Mason) - 5:24
 "Comfort Zone" (Carlton) - 4:55
 "Sebastian" (James) - 4:42
 "Blues on the Moon" [Bonus Track]  (Carlton, N. East, James, Mason) - 5:16

Personnel 

Fourplay
 Bob James – keyboards
 Larry Carlton – guitars
 Nathan East – bass guitar, vocals (4, 10)
 Harvey Mason – drums

Additional Personnel
 Elijah East – backing vocals (4)
 Noah East – backing vocals (4)
 Sara East – backing vocals (4)
 Esperanza Spalding – vocals (6)

Production 
 Fourplay – producers 
 Marcel East – producer (4)
 Bob James – vocal session producer (6)
 Dave Love – executive producer
 Ken Freeman – recording, mixing 
 Joshua Blanchard – recording assistant 
 Chris Allen – engineer
 Tom Gloady – assistant engineer
 Steve Vavagiakis – mastering 
 Robert Hoffman – art direction, design 
 Maura Lanahan – photography

References

Fourplay albums
2008 albums
Heads Up International albums